This is a list of all companies, organizations and individuals that manufacture Rubik's Cubes and other similar twisty puzzles.

List

References 

Rubik's Cube
Rubik's Cube